Liberty Township is a township in Grundy County, in the U.S. state of Missouri.

The first settlement at Liberty Township was made in the 1830s.

References

Townships in Missouri
Townships in Grundy County, Missouri